Muffy or Muffie is an American nickname and may refer to:

People 
 Muffie Cabot (born c. 1936), American heiress and socialite
 Muffy Calder (born 1958), Scottish computer scientist
 Marianna Davis (born 1972), American Paralympic cyclist, sit-skier and mountain climber
 Marjorie Fleming (1803–1811), Scottish child writer and poet
 Alie Israel (born 1983), American sprinter
 Esme Mackinnon (1913–1999), British world champion alpine skier
 Muffie Meyer, American film director
 Mayer Amschel de Rothschild (1818–1874), English businessman and politician, member of the Rothschild family
 Muffy McGraw (born 1955) Notre Dame University women's basketball coach

Fictional characters 
 Muffy, a character and a bachelorette in Harvest Moon: A Wonderful Life and Harvest Moon DS
 Nickname of the title character of Maureen Birnbaum, Barbarian Swordsperson, a 1993 anthology, and other short stories
 Muffy Alice Crosswire, in the children's book and animated children's television series Arthur
 Muffy, a recurring character in the sitcom That's So Raven
 Muffy B. Tepperman, in the 1982–1983 sitcom Square Pegs
 Muffy Mouse, in the 1980s Canadian children's television series Today's Special
 Muffy, in the 1986 horror film April Fool's Day

See also 
 Miffy, character in a series of picture books by Dutch artist Dick Bruna

Lists of people by nickname